Lino Urdaneta (born November 20, 1979) is a Venezuelan former professional baseball relief pitcher who played in Major League Baseball for the Detroit Tigers and the New York Mets.

Professional career
After seven years in the Los Angeles Dodgers and Cleveland Indians minor league systems, Urdaneta was selected by Detroit in the Rule 5 draft on December 15, 2003. Prior to joining the Tigers in 2004, he was sidelined due to inflammation in his right elbow.

Urdaneta made his Major League debut with the Tigers on September 9, 2004, allowing six earned runs without getting an out. Because of this, his career ERA was infinity.

On May 4, 2007, Urdaneta was brought up to the Major League roster by the Mets, replacing Chan Ho Park. He pitched in two games, lowering his career ERA to 63.00. Urdaneta was sent back down to Triple-A on May 15. On May 16, 2007, MLB suspended Urdaneta 50 games for testing positive for a performance-enhancing substance.

In his minor league career, Urdaneta compiled a 15–26 win–loss record with 49 saves, 204 strikeouts, and a 4.72 earned run average (ERA) in 217 games. He made the Florida State League All-Star Team in 2002.

See also
List of Major League Baseball players from Venezuela

References

External links

The Baseball Gauge
Venezuela Winter League

1979 births
Living people
Acereros de Monclova players
Baseball players suspended for drug offenses
Cardenales de Lara players
Caribes de Anzoátegui players
Detroit Tigers players
Gulf Coast Mets players
Guerreros de Oaxaca players
Jacksonville Suns players
Lakeland Tigers players
Langosteros de Cancún players
Leones del Caracas players
Major League Baseball pitchers
Major League Baseball players from Venezuela
Mexican League baseball pitchers
Navegantes del Magallanes players
New Orleans Zephyrs players
New York Mets players
Piratas de Campeche players
Rieleros de Aguascalientes players
St. Lucie Mets players
Baseball players from Caracas
St. George Roadrunners players
Tiburones de La Guaira players
Toledo Mud Hens players
Venezuelan expatriate baseball players in Mexico
Venezuelan expatriate baseball players in the United States
Vero Beach Dodgers players
Wilmington Waves players